Transpromotional ("transpromo") is a compound expression formed from the words "transaction" and "promotional". By adding relevant messages, companies can piggyback promotion or even advertising onto existing transaction-related documents, such as statements, invoices, or bills. Transpromotional documents combine CRM (customer relationship management) and data mining technology with variable data printing and location intelligence.

Using the real-estate on electronic documents and bills for marketing and promotional offers, results in a higher click rate and ROI than traditional email marketing has offered. Email content can be customized to include relevant, targeted and personalized marketing offers.

Overview 
Adding promotion onto existing transaction-related documents has a number of advantages over promotion by other means.

 Openability. Statements and invoices are expected — they contain important financial information and usually require action. More than 95% of transaction documents are opened and read each month – far more than any other type of direct response effort. 
 Engagement. Bills and statements receive more attention than any other form of communication including television advertisements. As a result, marketing included in these types of emails and documents has a higher click rate and conversion rate. The average customer invests between one and three minutes for statement review. 
 Cost efficiency. Transactional email messaging eliminates the need for costly traditional paper inserts.
 Reporting. Billers can track detailed promotion activity. This type of detailed tracking and reporting facilitates intelligent, revenue-based marketing decisions, derived from measurable customer behavior. 
 Returns. Statement-based marketing is effective because it targets current customers. A five percent increase in current customer business can translate into as much as a 50 percent increase in bottom-line profits.
 Customized offers. Statement-based marketing is effective because it enables customized offers to be automatically generated by the transactional data within the document itself. It can be personalized according to customer demographics, business drivers and marketing criteria.

See also
Ad creep
Document automation
Intelligent document
Customer experience
Document composition
Enterprise output management

References 

Advertising techniques